Mohammad Sami Agha (born 17 June 1989) is an Afghan cricketer.  Sami is a right-handed batsman.  He was born at Kandahar, Kandahar Province.

Sami played a single match for Afghanistan against Hong Kong in the quarter-finals of the cricket competition at the 2010 Asian Games. Afghanistan eventually won the silver medal.  Sami made his Twenty20 debut for the Afghan Cheetahs in the Faysal Bank Twenty-20 Cup against Rawalpindi Rams.  He played a further match in that competition, against Faisalabad Wolves.  In these two matches, he scored a total of 10 runs at an average of 5.00, with a high score of 10.

He made his first-class debut for Boost Region in the 2017–18 Ahmad Shah Abdali 4-day Tournament on 26 October 2017.

References

External links
Mohammad Sami Aghi at ESPNcricinfo
Mohammad Sami Aghi at CricketArchive

1989 births
Living people
Sportspeople from Kandahar
Afghan cricketers
Asian Games silver medalists for Afghanistan
Cricketers at the 2010 Asian Games
Asian Games medalists in cricket
Afghan Cheetahs cricketers
Boost Defenders cricketers
Pashtun people
Medalists at the 2010 Asian Games